St. Bernard State Park is a state park located in the American state of Louisiana, on a tract of land in St. Bernard Parish, between the towns of Poydras and Caernarvon. Though located only approximately eighteen miles southeast of New Orleans, attendance had been fledgling at the park for years, ranking among the least visited in the state.

History
The St. Bernard State Park was created in 1971 when the land that the park sits on was donated to the state by local businessman and former State Senator Lynn Dean and his wife Jackie. The park operated for 34 years as the only state park in the St. Bernard/Plaquemines Parish area until it was severely damaged by storm surge from the levee failures during Hurricane Katrina. The park (along with Fort Pike State Historic Site)  remained closed for more than a year due to the severe damage but is now in full operation for camping, birdwatching and day use.

Facilities
St. Bernard State Park includes the following facilities as compared to that which is available at certain other Louisiana state parks as well as a waterpark and playground for children:

Restoration
St. Bernard State Park suffered extensive damage as a result of Hurricane Katrina.
The park was re-opened with a ceremony Tuesday, December 19, 2006 at 4 p.m. with ceremonies by then Lt. Gov. Mitch Landrieu, local dignitaries, local choirs, followed by hayride tours of the site, coffee, hot chocolate and cookies.

See also
List of Louisiana state parks

References

External links

St. Bernard State Park
Official Facebook Page

State parks of Louisiana
Protected areas on the Mississippi River
Protected areas of St. Bernard Parish, Louisiana